The Rajdoot, also known as the RD, was a two-stroke Yamaha motorcycle made in India by Escorts group from 1983 to 1989. RD stands for 'Race derived' , in India promoted by Rajdoot in collaboration with Yamaha Japan. 

It is a licensed copy of the Yamaha RD350B, modified to suit Indian conditions. Even though the production of the air-cooled Yamaha RD350 had ended in Japan in the mid-1970s due to stringent emissions norms, it was a technically advanced motorcycle in the Indian market in 1983. It has a 7-port two stroke parallel twin engine, Yamaha's patented Torque Induction System using reed valves, 6-speed manual transmission, autolube system, mechanical tachometer, 12 volt electrics and 0-60 km/h in less than four seconds. In the interest of cost, the front disc brake of the RD350B was substituted with a 7" twin leading shoe drum brake from the Yamaha RD250.

It was primarily targeted at the Royal Enfield Bullet 350, which was the biggest-capacity motorbike in India at the time. The Yezdi Roadking 250 was another competitor. However, the Rajdoot 350 was not a commercial success due to its relatively high fuel consumption in a cost-conscious Indian market. High purchase price, poor availability of expensive spare parts and lack of trained service personnel did not help either. After the runaway success of its smaller stablemate Yamaha RX 100 introduced in 1985, the Rajdoot 350 stayed in production as a flagship model, and production ended in 1990. The last bikes were reported to be sold in 1991.

HT and LT Models 
The Yamaha RD350B was substantially modified before it was produced in India as the Rajdoot 350. The engine was detuned, the carburettors were rejetted for fuel economy rather than performance, the front disc brake was substituted for a cheaper 180 mm TLS drum brake, the instruments are copies of the older Yamaha R5, the alternator has less output and the tank graphics are re-badged "Rajdoot" and not "Yamaha". The only Yamaha branding is on either side of the engine. The early bikes have high Japanese part content, but Escorts India localised most of the parts in less than three years.

Rajdoot 350 was made in two models - 'High Torque (HT)' and 'Low Torque (LT)'.
'High Torque (HT)'
 The HT was made from 1983 to 1985 (until 1989 for Government). Some HTs have mufflers with flatter ends. HT exhausts make the raucous "RD growl" compared to the more toned-down LT beat.
'Low Torque (LT)'
 LT was made from 1985 to 1989. It develops only  because the exhaust ports are restricted even further. Carburetors are jetted small in the interest of fuel economy. All LTs have the left engine cover marked "Made in India". The mufflers have slightly tapered or conical ends. The build quality is inferior to that of the HT models. The only notable upgrades to the LT in 1988 was slightly stiffer front forks in 1989.We can Identify whether it is HT or LT By looking at the starting of engine number. Engine number of HT Starts with 1A1 and LT Starts with 00

The other side 
A variety of issues hindered the sales of RD350 in India. Maintenance of an RD350 was not an easy task as Escort's service network was not so good in those days, and there were not enough trained mechanics who could handle its twin-cylinder engine. Spare parts were neither readily available nor very affordable. The HT's fuel consumption is 20 km/L (urban) 25 (mixed), that of the LT is 35 km/L - figures considered quite steep by most of the population at the time.

See also 
 Yamaha RD350
 List of Yamaha motorcycles

Rajdoot 350
Escorts motorcycles
Motorcycles introduced in 1983
Two-stroke motorcycles
Standard motorcycles
Motorcycles powered by straight-twin engines